The 2018–19 Cincinnati Bearcats women's basketball team will represent the University of Cincinnati during the 2018–19 NCAA Division I women's basketball season. The season marks the sixth for the Bearcats as members of the American Athletic Conference. The Bearcats, led by first year head coach Michelle Clark-Heard, will return to play their home games at Fifth Third Arena after a one year for renovation. They finished the season 24–11, 12–4 in AAC play to finish in third place. They advanced to the semifinals of the American Athletic women's tournament where they lost to UCF. They received an automatic bid Women's National Invitation Tournament where they defeated Youngstown State, Minnesota, Butler in the first, second and third rounds before losing to TCU in the quarterfinals.

Media
All games will have a video stream on Bearcats TV, ESPN3, or AAC Digital Network

Offseason

Departing players

2018 Recruits
The Bearcats did not sign any high school recruits for the 2018-19 season.

Incoming transfers

Roster

Schedule and results

|-
!colspan=12 style=""| Exhibition

|-
!colspan=12 style=""| Non-conference regular season

|-
!colspan=12 style=""| AAC regular season

|-
!colspan=12 style=""| AAC Women's Tournament

|-
!colspan=12 style=""| WNIT

Awards and milestones

American Athletic Conference honors

All-AAC Awards
Newcomer of the Year: Florence Sifa

All-AAC First Team
IImar’I Thomas

All-AAC Second Team
Antoinette Miller

See also
 2018–19 Cincinnati Bearcats men's basketball team

References

External links
Official website

Cincinnati
Cincinnati Bearcats women's basketball seasons
Cincinnati